Karl Wilhelm Wutzer (17 March 1789, Berlin – 19 September 1863, Bonn) was a German surgeon.

He studied medicine at the Berlin-Pépinière (military institute), later becoming director of the surgical school at Münster (1821). In 1830 he succeeded Karl August Weinhold (1782-1829) as professor of surgery at Halle, afterwards (1833), relocating to the University of Bonn as a successor to Philipp Franz von Walther (1782-1849). In 1850 he began to experience serious eye problems, a condition that eventually put an end to his surgical career.

As a surgeon, he originated an operative procedure for inguinal hernia, and was an early practitioner of surgery for vesico-vaginal fistula (VVF).

In the field of ophthalmology, he published a translation of a work by Antonius Gerardus van Onsenoort (1782-1841) with the title of, Geschichte der Augenheilkunde als Einleitung in das Studium (History of ophthalmology as an introduction to study).

References 

1789 births
1863 deaths
Academic staff of the University of Bonn
Academic staff of the University of Halle
Academic staff of the University of Münster
Physicians from Berlin
German surgeons